Cydia albipicta is a species of moth belonging to the family Tortricidae.

It is native to Western Europe.

References

Grapholitini
Moths described in 1968